William Henry Bacon (born July 5, 1948) is an American former basketball player. He played collegiately for the University of Louisville.

Bacon was selected by the Golden State Warriors in the fifth round (73rd pick overall) of the 1972 NBA draft, and by the Memphis Pros in the 1972 ABA Draft.  He played for the San Diego Conquistadors (1972–73) in the ABA for 47 games.

External links

1948 births
Living people
American men's basketball players
Basketball players from Louisville, Kentucky
Golden State Warriors draft picks
Louisville Cardinals men's basketball players
Louisville Male High School alumni
Memphis Sounds draft picks
Parade High School All-Americans (boys' basketball)
San Diego Conquistadors players
Shooting guards